Porn Star, Porn star or Pornstar may refer to:

Pornographic film actor, male or female actor in pornographic films
"Pornstar" (Amy Meredith song)
"Porn Star", a song by Faster Pussycat on their album The Power and the Glory Hole
"Porn Star", a song by Maty Noyes on her EP Love Songs From a Lolita
Porn Stars (album), an album by Pretty Boy Floyd
Porn Star: The Legend of Ron Jeremy, a 2001 documentary, written and directed by Scott J. Gill, detailing the life of porn legend Ron Jeremy
Pornostar (film), a Japanese film
Porn star martini, a vodka cocktail

See also
"Porn Star Dancing", debut single by the Canadian rock band My Darkest Days 
Porn Star Diaries, a documentary made by Sex Station's producer in 2006, featuring interviews about porn careers and industry